

René Lévesque Park is an urban park in Montreal, Quebec, Canada. It is located in the borough of Lachine on a jetty between the Saint Lawrence River and the end of the Lachine Canal. Approximately  in area, it is named after René Lévesque, the prime minister of Quebec from 1976 to 1985.

The park features a bicycle path, an arboretum and several species of birds. Road access to the park is mainly through the Chemin du Canal, an extension of Saint Patrick Street.

History
The jetty was created in 1883 during a late expansion of the Lachine Canal. A parallel jetty, created in 1848 during the canal's first major expansion, is used as a yacht club.

Sculpture Garden
There is a sculpture garden consisting of twenty two sculptures by Quebec artists in the park. The sculptures were unveiled during three sculpture symposiums, the first having taken place in 1985. The sculpture garden is part of the Lachine Museum.

Among the sculptures are:

C
 Les cariatides  (1988), by Takera Narita
 Cheval à plume (1988), by Miroslav Frederik Maler
 China Wall (1986), by Jean-Marie Delavalle

D
 Le déjeuner sur l'herbe (1997), by Dominique Rolland
 Détour : le grand jardin (1994), by Michel Goulet

E
 Écluses (1994), by Octavian Olariu
 Explorer (1994), by Mark Prent

F
 From A (1986), by Dominque Valade

H
 Hermès (1988), by Graham Cantieni
 Hommage à René Lévesque (1988), by Robert Roussil

P
 The Passing Song (1992), by Catherine Widgery
 Le phare d'Archimède (1986), by Dominque Rolland
 La pierre et le feu (1985), by Jean-Pierre Morin

S
 Signal pour Takis (1986), by Pierre Leblanc
 Site/Interlude (1994), by David Moore
 Souvenir de 1955 ou 2026 Roberval  (1992), by Pierre Leblanc
 Story Rock (1986), by Bill Vazan

V
 La ville blanche (1986), by André Fournelle
 Vire au vent (1988), by Gilles Boisvert
 Vortexit II  (2009), by Bill Vazan
 Les voûtes d'Ulysse (1992), by Guy Nadeau

References

Lachine, Quebec
Parks in Montreal
Sculpture gardens, trails and parks in Canada
René Lévesque